Hortophora is a genus of South Pacific orb-weaver spiders first described by V. W. Framenau, R. L. C. Baptista and F. S. M. Oliveira in 2021.

Species
 it contains thirteen species:
H. biapicata (L. Koch, 1871) – Australia
H. capitalis (L. Koch, 1871) – New Caledonia, Vanuatu, Fiji
H. cucullus Framenau & Castanheira, 2021 – Australia (Western Australia, Northern Territory, Queensland, South Australia)
H. flavicoma (Simon, 1880) – New Caledonia (incl. Loyalty Is.)
H. lodicula (Keyserling, 1887) – Australia (Queensland, New South Wales, Victoria, Tasmania)
H. megacantha Framenau & Castanheira, 2021 – Australia (Queensland, New South Wales)
H. porongurup Framenau & Castanheira, 2021 – Australia (Western Australia)
H. tatianeae Framenau & Castanheira, 2021 – Australia (South Australia, Queensland, New South Wales, Victoria, Tasmania)
H. transmarina (Keyserling, 1865) – Papua New Guinea, Australia (Western Australia, Northern Territory, Queensland, New South Wales, Victoria, Norfolk Is.)
H. urbana (Keyserling, 1887) – Australia (Western Australia, Queensland, New South Wales, Victoria)
H. viridis (Keyserling, 1865) – Samoa
H. walesiana (Karsch, 1878) – Australia (Western Australia, Northern Territory, Queensland, New South Wales)
H. yesabah Framenau & Castanheira, 2021 – Australia (Queensland, New South Wales)

See also
 List of Araneidae species: G–M

References

Further reading

Araneidae genera
Spiders of Oceania